Nambla is a census village in Baramula district, Jammu & Kashmir, India.

As per the 2011 Census of India, Nambla has a total population of 7,193 people including 3,688 males and 3,505 females with a literacy rate of 44.08%.

References 

Villages in Baramulla district